Hiatomyia  is a Holarctic genus of hoverflies that are shiny black with a plumose arista.

Species 
 Hiatomyia canadensis (Shannon, 1922)
 Hiatomyia chionthrix  Hull & fluke 1950 
 Hiatomyia chrysothrix (Hull & Fluke, 1950) 
 Hiatomyia coriacea (Hull & Fluke, 1950)
 Hiatomyia cyanea (Hunter, 1896)
 Hiatomyia cyanescens (Loew, 1863)
 Hiatomyia cyascens (Loew , 1863)
 Hiatomyia gemini (Shannon, 1922)
 Hiatomyia hecate (Hull & Fluke, 1950)
 Hiatomyia hyacintha (Hull & Fluke, 1950)
 Hiatomyia idahoa (Shannon, 1922)
 Hiatomyia nigrocyanea (Hull & Fluke, 1950)
 Hiatomyia niveifrons (Hull & Fluke, 1950)
 Hiatomyia nyctichroma (Hull & Fluke, 1950)
 Hiatomyia olivia (Hull & Fluke, 1950)
 Hiatomyia plumosa (Coquillett, 1904)
 Hiatomyia plutonia (Hunter, 1897)
 Hiatomyia rubroflava (Hull & Fluke, 1950)
 Hiatomyia signatiseta (Hunter, 1896)
 Hiatomyia tessa (Hull & Fluke, 1950)
 Hiatomyia townsendi (Hunter, 1896)
 Hiatomyia willistoni  (Snow, 1895)

References 

Hoverfly genera
Eristalinae
Diptera of North America